Emigdio is a given name. Notable people with the name include:

Emigdio Ayala Báez (1917–1993), Paraguayan musician
Óscar Emigdio Benítez (born 1948), former El Salvador football player and manager
Emigdio Flores Calpiñeiro (born 1950), Bolivian politician and sociologist
Emigdio C. Cruz, Philippine Army officer, received the Philippines' highest military award for courage, the Medal of Valor
Elías Emigdio (born 1991), Mexican boxer
Alcides Emigdio Lanza (born 1929), Canadian composer, conductor, pianist, and music educator of Argentinian birth
Luis Emigdio Vega Torres (born 1998), Cuban swimmer
Emigdio Vasquez (1939–2014), Chicano-American artist, social realist muralist and educator

See also
San Emigdio Creek, a 33 km northward-flowing stream in western Kern County, central California
San Emigdio, municipality in the La Paz department of El Salvador
San Emigdio blue, Plebejus emigdionis in the family of butterflies known as Lycaenidae
San Emigdio Formation, geologic formation in California
San Emigdio Mountain, in the San Emigdio Mountains
San Emigdio Mountains, part of the Transverse Ranges in Southern California
Emigi